Bulgarian Tsardom  may refer to:
First Bulgarian Empire or First Bulgarian Tsardom
Second Bulgarian Empire or Second Bulgarian Tsardom
Kingdom of Bulgaria, or Third Bulgarian Empire or Third Bulgarian Tsardom

See also
Tsardom of Bulgaria